The Catholic Commission for Justice and Peace in Zimbabwe (CCJPZ) is a non-governmental organization whose aim is to highlight the plight of the Zimbabwean people and assist in cases of human rights abuse.

The CCJPZ was established in 1972 as the Catholic Commission for Justice and Peace in Rhodesia. The commission changed its name when Rhodesia became Zimbabwe after independence in 1980 and has offices in Harare, Bulawayo, Binga village, and Mutare, along with the presence of a "Justice and Peace committee in each diocese.  Its stated duties are ;to inform people's consciences; to make people aware of their rights and duties as         citizens; to encourage love, understanding and harmony through the promotion of the Church's         social teaching; to investigate allegations of injustice which it considers to merit attention, and to         take appropriate action; to keep in contact with other organisations with similar aims and objectives and;to advise the Bishop's Conference on the human rights situation pertaining from         time to time.

Outreach
In March 1997, the Catholic Commission for Justice and Peace in Zimbabwe compiled the report on the situation in Matabeleland and the Midlands during the period of 1980-1988 titled Breaking the Silence, Building True Peace. The report was based on the human rights abuses orchestrated by Prime Minister Robert Mugabe's North Korean-trained Zimbabwean Fifth Brigade, which was known within the nation as the Gukurahundi.The publication of the report was possible because Zimbabwe had been enjoying a period of stability and national unity since the Unity Accord of 1987.

As one of the few human rights organisations in Zimbabwe, CCJPZ has made significant contributions to the documentation of the injustices and suffering of the Zimbabwean people during the Rhodesian Bush War and Gukurahundi. In the late nineties the Commission distributed impartial literature on the right to vote  which led to a high voter turnout for the 2000 parliamentary elections.

Recording History
The CCJPZ has recorded crucial chapters of Zimbabwe's history in reports and publications since before independence in 1980. These records encompass the Rhodesian Bush War, Gukurahundi, pre-election and post election violence since independence.

Past Directors
Mr C. Mhondoro    1981-1982
Ms Dorita Field   1983-1984
Mr C. Maveneka    1984-1986
Nicholas Ndebele  1986-1991
Mike Auret        1992-1999
A.M. Chaumba

Past Chair Persons
Mike Auret    1981-1990
Peter Peel    1990-1992
Charles Dube  1992-2000

Aliyeli Lungu       -2016

Yvonne Winfildah Takawira-Matwaya  2016–Present

Affiliations
CCJPZ is a Commission of the Zimbabwe Catholic Bishops' Conference with an affiliation to the Pontifical Council for Justice and Peace in Rome and has active contact with Commissions in other countries.

Archival Information
Reaching for Justice, a history of the CCJP (Mambo Press, 1992)
Caught in The Crossfire (Video detailing the plight of the Zimbabwean people in the Liberation War of the 1970s)
Catholic Institute for International Relations, Catholic Commission for Justice and Peace in Rhodesia. Rhodesia After the Internal Settlement, 1978

References

External links
Breaking the Silence, Building True Peace. A report on the disturbances in Matabeleland and the Midlands 1980–1988
Kubatana.net
.

History of Zimbabwe
Politics of Zimbabwe